Polytech High School is located in Woodside, Delaware. It was a vocational school starting in the 1960s and changed to a full-time high school in 1991. Polytech admits students from Kent County through a lottery system.  At Polytech 9th grade students go through a shop rotation, choosing a shop to major in during their high school years.

Academies and shops

References

High schools in Kent County, Delaware
Public high schools in Delaware